This is a list of mayors of the city of Burgdorf, Canton of Bern, Switzerland. The Stadtpräsident chairs the Gemeinderat, the executive of Burgdorf. 

Burgdorf
 
Burgdorf, Switzerland